Maxim Gorky is a rural locality (a village) in Arkh-Latyshsky Selsoviet, Arkhangelsky District, Bashkortostan, Russia. The population was 802 as of 2010. There are 24 streets.

Geography 
Maxim Gorky is located 14 km south of Arkhangelskoye (the district's administrative centre) by road. Zarya is the nearest rural locality.

References 

Rural localities in Arkhangelsky District